Graeco-Roman paganism may refer to:

 Paganism, the polytheistic practices of the Roman Empire before Christianization
 Ancient Roman religion
 Ancient Greek religion
 Hellenism (modern religion)
 Roman Polytheistic Reconstructionism
 Nova Roma
 Greco-Roman religion (disambiguation)